Lumeah is a small town in the Great Southern region of Western Australia

References

Great Southern (Western Australia)